The Waruna language is a Papuan language of the New Guinea, spoken in a bend of the Fly River. It has 50% lexical similarity with Ari, its closest relative. It is spoken in the single village of Waruna in Gogodala Rural LLG.

Bibliography
Word lists
Ray, Sidney H. 1923. The languages of the Western Division of Papua. Journal of the Royal Anthropological Institute of Great Britain and Ireland 53: 332–360.
Riley, E. Baxter and Sidney H. Ray. 1930–1931. Sixteen vocabularies from the Fly River, Papua. Anthropos 25: 173–193, 831–850, 26: 171–192.

References

Languages of Papua New Guinea
Gogodala–Suki languages